Sierra de Los Filabres is the largest mountain range in Almería Province, Andalusia, Spain, measuring  in length.

Its highest point, the Calar Alto is also the highest peak in the province of Almería and hosts an important astronomical observatory.

Geography
The Sierra de Los Filabres belongs to the Penibaetic System and forms the southern limit of the Almanzora Valley. Besides its highest point, the 2,168 m high Calar Alto, other important peaks are the Tetica de Bacares or "La Tetica" (2,086 m), a breast-shaped hill, and the Calar Gallinero (2,049 m).

The Sierra de Los Filabres is an eastern prolongation of the Sierra de Baza mountain range in the same system. There are picturesque towns in this range, like Olula de Castro, Chercos Viejo and Sierro, to name but a few.
The easiest route to reach the range starts from Gérgal.

See also
Baetic System
Calar Alto Observatory
Sierras de las Estancias y los Filabres DO

References

External links 

 Parque Natural de la Sierra de los Filabres y comarca del Alto Almanzora
Estación de Observación de Calar Alto (EOCA)
Trekking World - Sierra de Los Filabres

Filabres
Filabres
Geography of the Province of Almería